The Achi II government has governed the Ivory Coast since 20 April 2022.

Ministers 

 Patrick Achi, Prime Minister of Ivory Coast
 Kandia Camara. Minister of Foreign Affairs
 Téné Birahima Ouattara, Minister of Defence
 Kobenan Kouassi Adjoumani, Minister of Agriculture and Rural Development
 Vagondo Diomandé, Minister of Interior
 Kaba Nialé, Minister of Economy and Finance
 Mamadou Sangafowa Coulibaly
 Anne Désirée Ouloto, Minister of Public Service
 Amadou Koné, Minister of Transport

References

See also 

 Politics of Ivory Coast

Current governments
April 2022 events in Africa
2022 establishments in Ivory Coast
Cabinets established in 2022
Politics of Ivory Coast